The 2020 European Athletics Championships were to be the 25th edition of the international athletics competition between European nations, organised by the European Athletic Association. It was scheduled to take place from 26–30 August 2020 in the Charlety Stadium in Paris, France. It would have been the second time that France have hosted the championships, over eighty years since the French capital hosted the men's side of the 1938 European Athletics Championships. 

Due to the COVID-19 pandemic European Athletics and the Paris 2020 organising committee announced the championships were cancelled on 23 April 2020. It was cancelled for the first time since 1942 due to World War II. The event was not moved to an alternative date. Paris will later host the championships in 2030.

See also 
 2020 World Para Athletics European Championships

References

2020
Athletics in Paris
International athletics competitions hosted by France
European Athletics Championships
European Athletics Championships
European Athletics Championships
European Athletics Championship